The 1883 Michigan Wolverines football team represented the University of Michigan in the 1883 college football season. The Wolverines played their only home game at the Ann Arbor Fairgrounds.

Schedule

Roster
The following is the roster of the 1883 team as listed in the University of Michigan yearbook, The Palladium, for 1884.
Forwards
Elmer Beach (Treasurer of the Foot-Ball Association)
Harry Bitner
Horace Prettyman
Henry Killilea
Hugh P. Borden
Richard Dott

Halfbacks
Robert Campbell Gemmel, Salt Lake City, Utah
Albert I. Moore

Three-Quarter Back
William J. Olcott

Fullback
Thomas W. Gilmore (President of the Foot-Ball Association)

Substitutes
Raymond Walter Beach, from Atwood, Michigan
Henry S. Mahon (Secretary of the Foot-Ball Association)
Edgar B. Wright

Coaching staff
Coach: No coach
Captain: William J. Olcott
Manager: Horace Prettyman

Notes

References

External links
 1883 Football Team -- Bentley Historical Library, University of Michigan Athletics History
 The Michigan Argonaut, 1883-1884
 The Chronicle, 1883-1884
 The Palladium, 1884

Michigan
Michigan Wolverines football seasons
Michigan Wolverines football